Jaromír Šimr (born 31 January 1979), known in the Netherlands as Jarda Šimr, is a retired Czech footballer.

Born in Plzeň, Šimr began his career in the youth system of local side Viktoria Plzeň, before moving to Feyenoord's youth academy in 1995.

After a move to RKC Waalwijk (without making a senior appearance), he would eventually make his senior league debut on 14 August 1999, for Excelsior, against Go Ahead Eagles. Over the following two seasons, he became a key player and this led to a move to NEC Nijmegen. 

In 2003 he scored the goal to take NEC into the UEFA Cup (qualifying for Europe through their league position for the first time).

After leaving NEC, he played for Polish side Amica Wronki, then returned for a single season with Excelsior, before winding down his career at three Plzeň clubs: Viktoria, Senco Doubravka, Spartak Chrast, Slavoj Kolovec and finally Plzeň Bukovec, where he ended his playing career in 2014.

References

1979 births
Living people
Czech footballers
RKC Waalwijk players
Excelsior Rotterdam players
NEC Nijmegen players
Amica Wronki players
FC Viktoria Plzeň players
Czech First League players
Eredivisie players
Eerste Divisie players
Ekstraklasa players
Czech expatriate footballers
Czech expatriate sportspeople in the Netherlands
Expatriate footballers in the Netherlands
Czech expatriate sportspeople in Poland
Expatriate footballers in Poland
Sportspeople from Plzeň
Association football midfielders